Hugh Heyne Smythe (August 19, 1913 – June 22, 1977) was an American author, sociologist, diplomat and professor. He was an authority on African anthropology and East Asian studies. He served as the United States Ambassador to Syria from 1965 to 1967 and United States Ambassador to Malta from 1967 to 1969.

Smythe was the tenth African-American U.S. ambassador and the first to a Middle Eastern country. His tenure coincided with the Six-Day War and the severing of diplomatic ties with the United States. He later became notorious for the "Smythe Telegram" that he wrote during the increasing tensions before the war, where he demanded that the U.S. return to a pro-Arab foreign policy and said that the U.S. should ignore previous promises to Israel that Egypt would not be allowed to ban Israeli ships from transiting the Straits of Tiran. He left the country on June 8, 1967.

References
 United States Department of State: Chiefs of Mission for Malta
 United States Department of State: Chiefs of Mission for Syria
 Smythe Biographical Notes
 Papers of Hugh H. Smythe and Mabel M. Smythe, circa 1895-1997
 Hugh Smythe in-depth bio
 

1913 births
1977 deaths
Writers from Pittsburgh
American sociologists
African-American diplomats
Virginia State University alumni
Clark Atlanta University alumni
Northwestern University alumni
Ambassadors of the United States to Syria
Ambassadors of the United States to Malta
20th-century African-American people